The 2021 Primera División season, officially Liga de Fútbol Profesional Venezolano or Liga FUTVE, was the 65th season of the Venezuelan Primera División, the top-flight football league in Venezuela, and the 40th season since the start of the professional era. The season started on 11 April and ended on 11 December 2021.

Deportivo Táchira were the champions, winning their ninth league title by defeating Caracas 4–2 on penalties following a 0–0 draw after extra time in the final. Deportivo La Guaira were the defending champions, but they were eliminated in Fase Final A.

Format changes
The league was expanded to 21 teams as relegation was suspended for the previous season due to the COVID-19 pandemic. The 21 teams were divided into three groups of seven teams each according to geographic location, with the teams playing the other teams in their group four times (twice at home and twice away) in a round-robin format. The top four teams in each group advanced to the next stage, the top two to Fase Final A and the next two to Fase Final B. In both Hexagonals, the teams faced each other twice, with the champion being decided in Fase Final A. The teams of Fase Final A and the top two of Fase Final B qualified for international competitions.

Originally, the two worst ranked teams among the last-placed teams would be relegated, and the other one would be involved in a play-off against the Segunda División runner-up to determine the final spot in the 2022 season. However, on 24 September 2021 the FVF announced that all three last-placed teams in the groups would be relegated, with only one promotion from the Segunda División.

Teams

Stadia and locations

{|

|}

Managerial changes

Notes

First stage
The first stage began on 11 April and ended on 22 October 2021. The 21 teams were divided in three groups of seven teams each. The top two teams of each group advanced to Fase Final A and the next two to Fase Final B. The last-placed teams were relegated.

Occidental Group

Standings

Results

Central Group

Standings

Results

Oriental Group

Standings

Results

Fase Final A
Fase Final A was contested by the top two teams of the first stage groups, which played each other twice. The top two teams advanced to the final and also qualified for the 2022 Copa Libertadores along with the next best two teams, whilst the remaining two teams qualified for the 2022 Copa Sudamericana.

Standings

Results

Fase Final B
Fase Final B was contested by the third- and fourth-placed teams of the first stage groups, which played each other twice. The top two teams qualified for the 2022 Copa Sudamericana. Atlético Venezuela originally qualified to compete in Fase Final B on sporting merit, but withdrew due to their failure to comply with the requirements imposed by the FVF. Due to this, only five teams competed in Fase Final B.

Standings

Results

Final
The final was played at the Estadio Olímpico de la UCV in Caracas on 11 December 2021.

Top goalscorers

Source: Soccerway

Best XI
The Liga FUTVE announced the best XI team of the 2021 Liga FUTVE season between 14 and 17 December 2021. Additionally, seven relevant players were named in order to complete the team.

References

External links
  of the Venezuelan Football Federation 
 Liga FUTVE

Venezuela
Venezuelan Primera División seasons
1